Redcar East is a railway station on the Tees Valley Line, which runs between  and  via . It is owned by Network Rail and managed by Northern Trains.

Facilities
The station is unmanned, so passengers wishing to travel must buy tickets before boarding or on the train. In 2014, the station facilities were improved. The package for this station included new fully lit waiting shelters, renewed station signage, digital CIS displays and the installation of CCTV. The long-line Public Address system (PA) has been renewed and upgraded with pre-recorded train announcements.

Services

As of the May 2021 timetable change, the station is served by two trains per hour between Saltburn and Darlington via Middlesbrough, with one train per hour extending to Bishop Auckland. An hourly service operates between Saltburn and Bishop Auckland on Sunday. All services are operated by Northern Trains.

Rolling stock used: Class 156 Super Sprinter and Class 158 Express Sprinter

References

External links 
 
 

Railway stations in Redcar and Cleveland
DfT Category F1 stations 
Former London and North Eastern Railway stations
Railway stations in Great Britain opened in 1929
Northern franchise railway stations
Redcar